Antonín Kratochvíl (also written Antonin Kratochvil; born 12 April 1947) is a Czech-born American photojournalist. He is a founding member of VII Photo Agency.

Life and work
Kratochvíl was born in 1947 in Lovosice, Czechoslovakia. He gained a BFA in Photography from Gerrit Rietveld Academie, Amsterdam.

He has photographed Mongolia's street children for the magazine of the American Museum of Natural History and the Iraq War for Fortune.

He was suspended from VII Photo Agency in 2017 after sexual harassment allegations were made. He denied that they ever happened.

Sarah K. Stanley, in an essay on Kratochvíl's book Vanishing, called it "a unique compilation of images by a photographer who is distinguished by his great sensitivity to the plight of humans beings and animal species seeking survival in endangered habitats."

Publications

Publications by Kratochvíl
Broken Dream: 20 Years of War in Eastern Europe. New York: Monacelli, 1997. .
Incognito. Santa Fe, NM: Arena, 2001. . With a short introduction by Billy Bob Thornton and an interview by Mark Jacobson.
Sopravvivere. Milan: F. Motta, 2001. . Catalog of an exhibition held at the Galleria Grazia Neri, Milan.
Antonin Kratochvil. FotoTorst series no. 12. Prague: Torst, 2003. . English and Czech.
Vanishing. New York: de.MO, 2005. .
Persona: Portraits. Slovart, 2006. . With an introduction by Michael Persson.

Publications with contributions by Kratochvíl
Spirits and Ghosts: Journeys Through Mongolia. New York: powerHouse, 2003. . By Julia Calfee. Edited and with an introduction by Kratochvíl.
Endure: Renewal from Ground Zero. New York: Rockefeller Foundation, 2001. . By Kratochvíl, Jurek Wajdowicz, Carolina Salguero, Larry Towell and Alex Webb.

Awards
1991: Infinity Award: Photojournalist of the Year, International Center of Photography, New York City
1994: Dorothy Lange Prize
1995: Hasselblad Foundation Grant for Photography
1998: 1st prize, Portraits, Stories, World Press Photo, Amsterdam
2003: 1st prize, Nature, Singles, World Press Photo, Amsterdam
2005: Outstanding Achievement in Photojournalism, Lucie Awards

References

External links

VII Photo Agency Bio
Doctors Without Borders
Vogue Masters: Antonin Kratochvil from Vogue Italia on YouTube
Persona Exhibition / Antonin Kratochvil
World Press Photo Foundation

1947 births
Living people
People from Lovosice
Czech photographers
Czechoslovak emigrants to the United States
American people of Czech descent
VII Photo Agency photographers